Melema  may refer to:

Tito Melema, a character in Romola
Tito Melema, a mixed media work by Edward Clifford
Tesma melema, an African moth; see List of moths of Uganda
Saphenista melema Razowski, a moth in the Saphenista genus

See also
Malema